The Rochester Times is a newspaper in Rochester, New Hampshire, United States. It has been published since the 1900s.

References

External links
Official website

Newspapers published in New Hampshire
Weekly newspapers published in the United States